K. T. S. Tulsi (born 7 November 1947) is an Indian politician and a senior advocate in the Supreme Court of India. He was elected to the Rajya Sabha the upper house of Indian Parliament from Chhattisgarh as a member of the Indian National Congress earlier he  had been nominated to the Rajya Sabha. He has represented many notable people in various cases.

Early life
Tulsi was born on 7 November 1947 in Hoshiarpur, Punjab, India. He has received the Bachelor of Arts in Political Science from Panjab University and received the Bachelor of Law degree in 1971. After graduation he became a member of Bar of Punjab and Haryana High Court.

Writing
Between 1973 and 1976, Tulsi worked as a part-time lecturer and wrote two books Tulsi's Digest of Accident Claims Cases and Landlord & Tenant Cases. In 1976, he was appointed as the reported of Punjab series of Indian Law reports.

Career in law
In 1980, Tulsi started practicing criminal law. In 1987, he was appointed as a senior advocate. Three years later in 1990, he was designated Additional Solicitor General of India. Since 1994, he is the President of the Criminal Justice Society of India. Tulsi has fought many notable cases. He has represented the Indian government more than ten times in the Supreme Court. He represented Indian government in cases like the constitutional validity of the now extinct Terrorist and Disruptive Activities (Prevention) Act, and cases related to the assassination of Rajiv Gandhi former Prime Minister of India. He represented Tamil Nadu Government on Sankararaman Murder Case in which Seer of Kanchi Mutt Jeyendra Saraswathi Was involved, "for them a Brahmin is above the law!" was the famous quote was given during interview with Reddif.

He represented Sonia Gandhi's son-in-law Robert Vadra who is alleged to have amassed wealth and farm lands out of using his status as Gandhi family person, in Vadra-DLF land case. He also represented the victims of Uphaar Cinema fire in Delhi. He represented 1993 Delhi terror attack convict Devinder Pal Singh Bhullar and got his death sentence commuted. Tulsi had refused to represent the Gujarat government in Sohrabuddin encounter case.

Political career
In February 2014, Tulsi was nominated as a member of Rajya Sabha of Parliament of India by the President of India on the advice of the then  Congress led UPA government. In 2020 he was re-elected to the rajya sabha from Chhattisgarh unopposed.

Personal life
On 11 February 1973, he was married to Suman Tulsi. The couple have two daughters.

References

1947 births
People from Hoshiarpur
Panjab University alumni
Additional Solicitors General of India
20th-century Indian lawyers
Nominated members of the Rajya Sabha
Rajya Sabha members from Chhattisgarh
People from New Delhi
Living people
Indian National Congress politicians